The Nematocera (the name meaning "thread-horns") are a suborder of elongated flies with thin, segmented antennae and mostly aquatic larvae. This group is paraphyletic and contains all flies but species from suborder Brachycera (the name meaning "short-horns"), which includes more commonly known species such as the housefly or the common fruit fly. Families in Nematocera include mosquitoes, crane flies, gnats, black flies, and a multiple families commonly known as midges. The Nematocera typically have fairly long, fine, finely-jointed antennae. In many species, such as most mosquitoes, the female antennae are more or less threadlike, but the males have spectacularly plumose antennae.

The larvae of most families of Nematocera are aquatic, either free-swimming, rock-dwelling, plant-dwelling, or luticolous. Some families however, are not aquatic; for instance the Tipulidae tend to be soil-dwelling and the Mycetophilidae feed on fungi such as mushrooms. Unlike most of the Brachycera, the larvae of Nematocera have distinct heads with mouthparts that may be modified for filter feeding or chewing, depending on their lifestyles.

The pupae are orthorrhaphous which means that adults emerge from the pupa through a straight, longitudinal seam in the dorsal surface of the pupal cuticle.

The bodies and legs of most adult Nematocera are elongated, and many species have relatively long abdomens.

Males of many species form mating swarms like faint pillars of smoke, competing for females that visit the cloud of males to find a mate.

Families
These families belong to the suborder Nematocera:

 Anisopodidae Knab, 1912 - wood gnats or window-gnats
 Axymyiidae Shannon, 1921
 Bibionidae Fleming, 1821 - march flies and love bugs
 Blephariceridae Loew, 1861 - net-winged midges
 Bolitophilidae Winnertz, 1863
 Canthyloscelididae Enderlein, 1912
 Cecidomyiidae Newman, 1835 - gall midges or gall gnats
 Ceratopogonidae Newman, 1834 - biting midges
 Chaoboridae Newman, 1834 - phantom midges
 Chironomidae Newman, 1834 - chironomids or nonbiting midges
 Corethrellidae Edwards, 1932 - frog-biting midges
 Culicidae Meigen, 1818 - mosquitoes
 Cylindrotomidae Schiner, 1863 - cylindrotomid crane flies
 Deuterophlebiidae Edwards, 1922 - mountain midges
 Diadocidiidae Winnertz, 1863
 Ditomyiidae Keilin, 1919
 Dixidae Schiner, 1868 - meniscus midges
 Hesperinidae Schiner, 1864
 Keroplatidae Rondani, 1856 - predatory fungus gnats
 Limoniidae Rondani, 1856 - limoniid crane flies
 Lygistorrhinidae Edwards, 1925 - long-beaked fungus gnats
 Mycetophilidae Newman, 1834 - fungus gnats
 Nymphomyiidae Tokunaga, 1932
 Pachyneuridae Schiner, 1864
 Pediciidae Osten Sacken, 1859 - hairy-eyed crane flies
 Perissommatidae Colless, 1962
 Psychodidae Newman, 1834 - moth flies or drain flies
 Ptychopteridae Osten Sacken, 1862 - phantom crane flies
 Rangomaramidae Jaschhof & Didham, 2002
 Scatopsidae Newman, 1834 - minute black scavenger flies or dung midges
 Sciaridae Billberg, 1820 - dark-winged fungus gnats
 Simuliidae Newman, 1834 - black flies
 Tanyderidae Osten Sacken, 1880 - primitive crane flies
 Thaumaleidae Bezzi, 1913 - trickle midges
 Tipulidae Latreille, 1802 - large crane flies
 Trichoceridae Rondani, 1841 - winter crane flies
 Valeseguyidae Amorim & Grimaldi, 2006
 † Ansorgiidae Krzemiñski & Lukashevich, 1993
 † Antefungivoridae Rohdendorf, 1938
 † Archizelmiridae Rohdendorf, 1962
 † Asiochaoboridae Hong & Wang, 1990
 † Boholdoyidae Kovalev, 1985
 † Cascopleciidae Poinar Jr., 2010
 † Crosaphididae Kovalev, 1983
 † Elliidae Krzeminska, Blagoderov & Krezmiñski, 1993
 † Eoditomyiidae Ansorge, 1996
 † Eopolyneuridae Rohdendorf, 1962
 † Grauvogeliidae Krzemiñski, 1999
 † Hennigmatidae Shcherbakov, 1995
 † Heterorhyphidae Ansorge & Krzemiñski, 1995
 † Hyperpolyneuridae Rohdendorf, 1962
 † Luanpingitidae Zhang, 1986
 † Mesosciophilidae Rohdendorf, 1946
 † Nadipteridae Lukashevich, 1995
 † Palaeophoridae Rohdendorf, 1951
 † Paraxymyiidae Rohdendorf, 1946
 † Pleciofungivoridae Rohdendorf, 1946
 † Procramptonomyiidae Kovalev, 1983
 † Protendipedidae Rohdendorf, 1951
 † Protopleciidae Rohdendorf, 1946
 † Protorhyphidae Handlirsch, 1906
 † Protoscatopsidae Rohdendorf, 1946
 † Serendipidae Evenhuis, 1994
 † Siberhyphidae Kovalev, 1985
 † Strashilidae Rasnitsyn, 1992
 † Tanyderophrynidae Rohdendorf, 1962
 † Tethepomyiidae Grimaldi & Arillo, 2009
 † Tillyardipteridae Lukashevich & Shcherbakov, 1999
 † Tipulodictyidae Rohdendorf, 1962
 † Tipulopleciidae Rohdendorf, 1962
 † Vladipteridae Shcherbakov, 1995

References 

 Borror, D. J., DeLong, D. M., Triplehorn, C. A.(1976) Fourth edition. An introduction to the study of insects. Holt, Rinehart and Winston. New York, Chicago. 
 Arnett, R. H. Jr. (2000) Second edition. American insects. CRC Press, Boca Raton, Londres, New York, Washington, D. C.

External links
Image Gallery from Diptera.info
Gnats (Nematocera)

 
Insect suborders